Vladimir Nikolayevich Toporov (5 July 1928 in Moscow5 December 2005 in Moscow) was a leading Russian philologist associated with the Tartu-Moscow semiotic school. His wife was Tatyana Elizarenkova.

Toporov authored more than 1500 works, including Akhmatova and Dante (1972), Towards the Reconstruction of the Indo-European Rite (1982), Aeneas: a Man of Destiny (1993), Myth. Rite. Symbol. Image (1995), Holiness and Saints in the Russian Spiritual Culture (1998), and Petersburg Text of Russian Literature (2003). He translated the Dhammapada into Russian and supervised the ongoing edition of the most complete vocabulary of the Prussian language to date (5 volumes).

Among Toporov's many honours were the USSR State Prize (1990), which he turned down to voice his protest against the repressive January Events of the Soviet administration in Lithuania; the first ever Solzhenitsyn Prize (1998), and the Andrei Bely Prize for 2004. He was a member of the Russian Academy of Sciences and many other scholarly societies.

External links 
 
 Obituary by the Russian Ministry of Culture

Balticists
Toporov
Toporov
Toporov
Full Members of the USSR Academy of Sciences
Toporov
Toporov
Toporov
Moscow State University alumni
Russian scholars of Buddhism
Researchers of Slavic religion
Solzhenitsyn Prize winners
Paleolinguists
20th-century philologists